Boun Neua is a district (muang) of Phongsaly province in northern Laos.

References

Districts of Phongsaly province